During the 2006–07 season, Betis finished 16th in the La Liga.

Squad

Competitions

La Liga

League table

Copa del Rey

References

Real Betis seasons
Real Betis